The 1995–96 A Group was the 48th season of the A Football Group, the top Bulgarian professional league for association football clubs, since its establishment in 1948.

Overview
It was contested by 16 teams, and Slavia Sofia won the championship. Lovech, renamed from Lex Lovech in the previous season, were relegated along with Spartak Plovdiv and Shumen.

League standings

Results

Champions
Slavia Sofia

Paskov, G. Dobrevski, Shalamanov, Bonchev and Shishkov left the club during a season.

Top scorers

Source:1995–96 Top Goalscorers

References

External links
Bulgaria – List of final tables (RSSSF)

First Professional Football League (Bulgaria) seasons
Bulgaria
1